Hitler's Circle of Evil is a British historical documentary television series.

Cast

Actors

Historians 
 Guy Walters
 Michael Lynch
 Sönke Neitzel
 Toby Thacker

Reception 
Sheldon Kirshner for The Times of Israel praised the portrayal of several events as 'professional' and said the series was "aptly titled".

References

External links 
 

Documentary television series about World War II
2010s British documentary television series